Joel Soñora (born September 15, 1996) is an American professional soccer player who plays as a midfielder for Liga MX club Juárez.

Early life
He is the son of the Argentine footballer Diego Soñora and brother of Alan Soñora. He was born in Dallas while his father was playing for the Dallas Burn but then returned to Argentina with his family in 2001 when his father's career ended.

Career
Soñora joined VfB Stuttgart II on January 22, 2016. On January 30, 2016 he made his debut for VfB Stuttgart II in the 3. Liga against FC Erzgebirge Aue.

On January 14, 2018, Soñora was loaned out to Talleres de Córdoba until the end of the year.

References

External links
 Joel Soñora at ussoccer.com
 
 

1996 births
Living people
American soccer players
American expatriate soccer players
Citizens of Argentina through descent
Argentine footballers
American people of Argentine descent
United States men's youth international soccer players
United States men's under-20 international soccer players
Association football midfielders
Soccer players from Dallas
Asociación Atlética Luján de Cuyo players
VfB Stuttgart II players
Talleres de Córdoba footballers
Arsenal de Sarandí footballers
Club Atlético Banfield footballers
Club Atlético Vélez Sarsfield footballers
C.S. Marítimo players
3. Liga players
Regionalliga players
American expatriate soccer players in Germany
American expatriate sportspeople in Portugal
Expatriate footballers in Portugal